The International Federation for Information Processing (IFIP) is a global organisation for researchers and professionals working in the field of computing to conduct research, develop standards and promote information sharing.

Established in 1960 under the auspices of UNESCO, IFIP is recognised by the United Nations and links some 50 national and international societies and academies of science with a total membership of over half a million professionals. IFIP is based in Laxenburg, Austria and is an international, non-governmental organisation that operates on a non-profit basis.

Overview 
IFIP activities are coordinated by 13 Technical Committees (TCs) which are organised into more than 100 Working Groups (WGs), bringing together over 3,500 ICT professionals and researchers from around the world to conduct research, develop standards and promote information sharing. Each TC covers a particular aspect of computing and related disciplines, as detailed below.

IFIP actively promotes the principle of open access and proceedings for which IFIP holds the copyright are made available electronically via IFIP's Open Access Digital Library.  Downloading articles from IFIP's Open Access Digital Library is free of charge.

Conference and workshop organizers who prefer publication with the IFIP publisher can take advantage of the agreement between IFIP and Springer and publish their proceedings as part of IFIP's Advances in Information and Communication Technology (AICT) series, the Lecture Notes in Computer Science (LNCS) series or the Lecture Notes in Business Information Processing (LNBIP) series. IFIP Proceedings published by Springer in IFIP's AICT, LNCS, and LNBIP series are accessible within IFIP's Open Access Digital Library after an embargo period of three years.

An important activity of the IFIP Technical Committees is to organise and sponsor high quality conferences and workshops in the field of ICT. Sponsoring is generally in the form of Best Paper Awards (BPA) and/or Student Travel Grants (STG). To assist conference and workshop organisers, IFIP has facilities to host conference websites and supports conference management systems such as JEMS, which include export functions that seamlessly integrate with IFIP's Open DL.

History 
IFIP was established in 1960 under the auspices of UNESCO, originally under the name of the International Federation of Information Processing Societies (IFIPS). In preparation, UNESCO had organised the first International Conference on Information Processing, which took place in June 1959 in Paris, and is now considered the first IFIP Congress. Christopher Strachey gave a paper "Time Sharing in Large Fast Computers" at the conference where he envisaged a programmer debugging a program at a console (like a teletype) connected to the computer, while another program was running in the computer at the same time. At the conference, he passed the concept on to J. C. R. Licklider.

The name was changed to IFIP in 1961. The founding president of IFIP was Isaac L. Auerbach (1960–1965).

In 2009, IFIP established the International Professional Practice Partnership (IFIP IP3) to lead the development of the global ICT profession."

Congresses 
As of 2022 the following IFIP World Computer Congress events took place:
 1959  Paris, France  (pre IFIP)
 1962  Munich, Germany
 1965  New York, USA
 1968  Edinburgh, UK
 1971  Ljubljana, Yugoslavia
 1974  Stockholm, Sweden
 1977  Toronto, Canada
 1980  Melbourne/Tokyo, Australia and Japan
 1983  Paris, France
 1986  Dublin, Ireland
 1989  San Francisco, USA
 1992  Madrid, Spain
 1994  Hamburg, Germany
 1996  Canberra, Australia
 1998  Vienna/Budapest, Austria and Hungary
 2000  Beijing, China
 2002  Montreal, Canada
 2004  Toulouse, France
 2006  Santiago, Chile
 2008  Milan, Italy
 2010  Brisbane, Australia
 2012  Amsterdam, The Netherlands
 2015  Daejeon, South Korea
 2018  Poznan, Poland

Technical Committees 
IFIP's activities are centered on its 13 Technical Committees, which are divided into Working Groups.  These groups, (with names like "WG 2.4 Software Implementation Technology") organise conferences and workshops, distribute technical papers and promote discussion and research outcomes.

A full list of IFIP Technical Committees is listed below:
 TC 1: Foundations of Computer Science
 TC 2: Software:Theory and Practice
 TC 3: Education
 TC 5: Information Technology Applications
 TC 6: Communication Systems
 TC 7: System Modeling and Optimization
 TC 8: Information Systems
 TC 9: Relationship between Computers and Society
 TC 10: Computer Systems Technology
 TC 11: Security and Protection in Information Processing Systems
 TC 12: Artificial Intelligence
 TC 13: Human-Computer Interaction
 TC 14: Entertainment Computing

IFIP TC1 Foundations of Computer Science 
The current IFIP TC1, which focuses on Foundations of Computer Science, was established in 1997. There was an earlier TC1, covering Terminology, which was IFIP's first Technical Committee. Formed in 1961, it produced a multilingual dictionary of information-processing terminology but was later disbanded.

The working groups of the current TC1 are:
 WG 1.1 Continuous Algorithms and Complexity  
 WG 1.2 Descriptional Complexity  
 WG 1.3 Foundations of System Specification  
 WG 1.4 Computational Learning Theory  
 WG 1.5 Cellular Automata and Discrete Complex Systems  
 WG 1.6 Term Rewriting  
 WG 1.7 Theoretical Foundations of Security Analysis and Design  
 WG 1.8 Concurrency Theory  
 WG 1.9 Verified Software (joint with WG 2.15)
 WG 1.10 String Algorithmics & Applications

IFIP TC2 Software Theory and Practice 
Established in 1962, IFIP TC2 explores Software Theory and Practice with the aim of improving software quality by studying all aspects of the software development process to better understand and enhance programming concepts.

The working groups of IFIP TC2 are:
 WG 2.1 on Algorithmic Languages and Calculi 
 WG 2.2 Formal Description of Programming Concepts
 WG 2.3 Programming Methodology
 WG 2.4 Software Implementation Technology
 WG 2.5 Numerical Software
 WG 2.6 Databases
 WG 2.7 User Interface Engineering (Joint with WG 13.4)
 WG 2.8 Functional Programming
 WG 2.9 Software Requirements Engineering 
 WG 2.10 on Software Architecture
 WG 2.11 Program Generation
 WG 2.12 Web Semantics (Joint with WG 12.14)
 WG 2.13 Open Source Software
 WG 2.14 Service-Oriented Systems (Joint with WG 6.12/WG8.10)
 WG 2.15 Verified Software (joint with WG 1.9)
 WG 2.16 Programming Language Design

IFIP TC3 Education 
The formation of TC3, to deal with computers and education, was announced in 1962. Richard Buckingham of the University of London was appointed  its first chairman and TC3 held its initial meeting in Paris in February 1964.

The working groups of IFIP TC3 are:
 WG 3.1 Informatics and Digital Technologies in School Education
 WG 3.3 Research into Educational Applications of Information Technologies
 WG 3.4 Professional and Vocational Education in ICT
 WG 3.7 Information Technology in Educational Management

IFIP TC5 Information Technology Applications 
Established in 1970, IFIP TC5 provides a focus for multi-disciplinary research into the application of information technologies and practices to facilitate information management. It encompasses work in product life-cycle management, digital modelling, virtual product creation, integrated manufacturing/production management and more.

The working groups of IFIP TC5 are:
 WG 5.1 Information Technology in the Product Realization Process
 WG 5.4 Computer Aided Innovation
 WG 5.5 Cooperation Infrastructure for Virtual Enterprises and Electronic Business (COVE)
 WG 5.7 Advances in Production Management Systems
 WG 5.8 Enterprise Interoperability
 WG 5.10 Computer Graphics and Virtual Worlds
 WG 5.11 Computers and Environment
 WG 5.12 Architectures for Enterprise Integration
 WG 5.13 Bioinformatives and its Applications
 WG 5.14 Advanced Information Processing for Agriculture

IFIP TC6 Communication Systems 
Established in 1971, IFIP TC6 (Communication Systems) is one of the largest TCs within IFIP in terms of activities and revenues. TC6 has nine Working Groups (WGs) as well as a number of Special Interest Groups (SIGs), the majority of which are concerned either with specific aspects of communications systems themselves or with the application of communications systems. In addition, one WG focuses on communications in developing countries. TC6 meets twice a year, in spring and fall, usually co-locating its meetings with a related conference. Examples of TC6 conferences include IFIP Networking, DisCoTec, Middleware, WiOpt, CNSM, Integrated Network Management (IM) and Wireless Days (WD).

Membership of a TC6 WG or SIG is open to leading researchers within the field, independent of the national society within the country of origin. Well-known (past) TC6 members include: Vint Cerf, André Danthine, Donald Davies, Roger Scantlebury, Peter Kirstein, Robert (Bob) Metcalfe, Louis Pouzin, Otto Spaniol and Hubert Zimmermann. Many were members of the International Networking Working Group. Each WG or SIG elects a chair and vice-chair for a period of three years. WG and SIG (vice-)chairs are, next to the national representatives and some key researchers, automatically members of TC6.

TC6 is a strong proponent of open access and the driving force behind the IFIP TC6 Open Digital Library (DL). The IFIP TC6 Open DL is currently operated by TC6 and eventually will move to the INRIA HAL system. To ensure maximum accessibility of accepted papers, several TC6 conferences publish their proceedings not only in the IFIP TC6 Open DL, but also in other online systems, such as IEEE Xplore, ACM DL, ResearchGate and arXiv.

TC6 supports conferences by providing Best Paper Awards (usually 500 Euro each) as well as Student Travel Grants (usually 750 Euro). Conference organisers who intend to obtain IFIP sponsorship are encouraged to fill-in the online Event Request Form (ERF). Depending on the category and type of event, IFIP may charge fees to conferences to cover the costs of (future) awards as well as the IFIP secretariat.

The working groups of IFIP TC6 are:
 WG 6.1 Architectures and Protocols for Distributed Systems
 WG 6.2 Network and Internetwork Architectures
 WG 6.3 Performance of Communication Systems
 WG 6.4 Internet Applications Engineering
 WG 6.6 Management of Networks and Distributed Systems
 WG 6.8 Mobile and Wireless Communications
 WG 6.9 Communications Systems in Developing Countries
 WG 6.10 Photonic Networking
 WG 6.11 Communication Aspects of the E-World
 WG 6.12 Service-Oriented Systems (Joint with WG 8.10/WG2.14)
In November 2015, a new Special Interest Group on "Internet of People" (IoP) was created.

IFIP TC7 System Modeling and Optimization 
IFIP TC7 was founded in 1972 by  A.V. Balakrishnan,  J.L. Lions and M. Marchuk.
The aims of this Technical Committee are
 to provide an international clearing house for computational (as well as related theoretical) aspects of optimization problems in diverse areas and to share computing experience gained on specific applications;
 to promote the development of necessary high-level theory to meet the needs of complex optimization problems and establish appropriate cooperation with the International Mathematics Union and similar organisations;
 to foster interdisciplinary activity on optimization problems spanning the various areas such as Economics (including Business Administration and Management), Biomedicine, Meteorology, etc., in cooperation with associated international bodies.

The working groups of IFIP TC7 are:
 WG 7.1 Modeling and Simulation
 WG 7.2 Computational Techniques in Distributed Systems
 WG 7.3 Computer System Modeling
 WG 7.4 Inverse Problems and Imaging
 WG 7.5 Reliability and Optimization of Structural Systems
 WG 7.6 Optimization-Based Computer-Aided Modeling and Design
 WG 7.7 on Stochastic Optimization

IFIP TC8 Information Systems 
IFIP TC8 was established in 1976 and focuses on Information Systems. This committee aims to promote and encourage the advancement of research and practice of concepts, methods, techniques and issues related to information systems in organisations. It currently includes the following working groups: 
 WG 8.1 Design and Evaluation of Information Systems
 WG 8.2 The Interaction of Information Systems and the Organization
 WG 8.3 Decision Support Systems
 WG 8.4 E-Business: Multi-disciplinary Research and Practice
 WG 8.5 Information Systems in Public Administration
 WG 8.6 Transfer and Diffusion of Information Technology
 WG 8.9 Enterprise Information Systems
 WG 8.10 Service-Oriented Systems (Joint with WG 6.12/2.14)
 WG 8.11 Information Systems Security Research (Joint with WG 11.13)

IFIP TC9 ICT and Society 

IFIP TC9 on ICT and Society was formed in 1976 to develop greater understanding of how ICT innovation is associated with changes in society and to influence the shaping of socially responsible and ethical policies and professional practices. The main work of the TC9 is conducted through its working groups, which organise regular conferences and events, including the Human Choice and Computers (HCC) conference series. This is a well established forum for the study of ICT and Society - the first HCC conference took place in Vienna in 1974, while the last one took place in Finland in 2014.

The working groups of IFIP TC9 are:

 WG 9.1 Computers and Work
 WG 9.2 Social Accountability and Computing
 SIG 9.2.2 Ethics and Computing
 WG 9.3 Home-Oriented Informatics and Telematics - HOIT
 WG 9.4 Social Implications of Computers in Developing Countries
 WG 9.5 Virtuality and Society
 WG 9.6 Information Technology Mis-use and the Law (Joint with WG 11.7) 
 WG 9.7 History of Computing
 WG 9.8 Gender Diversity and ICT
 WG 9.9 ICT and Sustainable Development
 WG 9.10 ICT Uses in Peace and War

IFIP TC10 Computer Systems Technology 

IFIP TC10 was founded in 1976 and revised in 1987.
It aims to promote State-of-the-Art concepts, methodologies and tools in the life cycle of computer systems and to coordinate the exchange of information around these practices.

TC10 currently has four working groups: 
 WG 10.2 Embedded Systems
 WG 10.3 Concurrent Systems
 WG 10.4 Dependable Computing and Fault Tolerance
 WG 10.5  Design and Engineering of Electronic Systems

IFIP TC11 Security and Privacy Protection in Information Processing Systems 
IFIP TC11 on Security and Privacy Protection in Information Processing Systems was founded in 1984 and revised in 2006 and 2009. It focuses on increasing the trustworthiness of, and general confidence in, information processing and providing a forum for security and privacy protection experts and others professionally active in the field to share information and advance standards.

IFIP TC11 currently has the following working groups:
 WG 11.1 Information Security Management
 WG 11.2 Pervasive Systems Security
 WG 11.3 Data and Application Security and Privacy
 WG 11.4 Network & Distributed Systems Security
 WG 11.5 IT Assurance and Audit
 WG 11.6 Identity Management
 WG 11.7 Information Technology: Misuse and The Law (Joint with WG 9.6)
 WG 11.8 Information Security Education 
 WG 11.9 Digital Forensics
 WG 11.10 Critical Infrastructure Protection
 WG 11.11 Trust Management
 WG 11.12 Human Aspects of Information Security and Assurance
 WG 11.13 Information Systems Security Research (Joint with WG 8.11)
 WG 11.14 Secure Engineering

IFIP TC12 Artificial Intelligence 
IFIP TC12 on Artificial Intelligence was established in 1984 and revised in 1991 and 2004. It aims to foster the development and understanding of Artificial Intelligence (AI) and its applications worldwide and to promote interdisciplinary exchanges between AI and other fields of information processing.

IFIP TC12 currently includes the following working groups:
 WG 12.1 Knowledge Representation and Reasoning
 WG 12.2 Machine Learning and Data Mining
 WG 12.3 Intelligent Agents
 WG 12.4 Semantic Web
 WG 12.5 Artificial Intelligence Applications
 WG 12.6 Knowledge Management & Innovation AI4KM  
 WG 12.7 Social Networking Semantics and collective Intelligence
 WG 12.8 Intelligent Bioinformatics and Biomedical Systems
 WG 12.9 Computational Intelligence

IFIP TC13 Human-Computer Interaction 
IFIP TC 13 on Human-Computer Interaction was founded in 1989. It aims to encourage empirical research (using valid and reliable methodology, with studies of the methods themselves where necessary); to promote the use of knowledge and methods from the human sciences in both design and evaluation of computer systems; to promote better understanding of the relation between formal design methods and system usability and acceptability; to develop guidelines, models and methods by which designers may be able to provide better human-oriented computer systems; and to co-operate with other groups, inside and outside IFIP, so as to promote user-orientation and "humani-zation" in system design.

TC 13 currently has nine working groups:

WG 13.1 Education in HCI and HCI Curricula
WG 13.2 Methodology for User-Centered System Design  
WG 13.3 Human-Computer Interaction and Disability  
WG 13.4 User Interface Engineering (Joint with WG 2.7) 
WG 13.5 Resilience, Reliability, Safety and Human Error in System Development
WG 13.6 Human-Work Interaction Design
WG 13.7 Human-Computer Interaction & Visualization (HCIV) 
WG 13.8 Interaction Design and International Development
WG 13.9 Interaction Design and Children

IFIP TC14 Entertainment Computing 
Created in 2002 as SG16, on August 28, 2006, the General Assembly of IFIP decided to establish this new Technical Committee. To encourage computer applications for entertainment and to enhance computer utilization in the home, the technical committee will pursue the following aims: to enhance algorithmic research on board and card games; to promote a new type of entertainment using information technologies; to encourage hardware technology research and development to facilitate implementing entertainment systems, and; to encourage non-traditional human interface technologies for entertainment.

WG 14.1 Digital Storytelling 
WG 14.2 Entertainment Robot 
WG 14.3 Theoretical Foundation of Entertainment Computing 
WG 14.4 Entertainment Games 
WG 14.5 Social and Ethical Issues 
WG 14.6 Interactive TeleVision (ITV) 
WG 14.7 Art and Entertainment 
WG 14.8 Serious Games 
WG 14.9 Game Accessibility

Members 
List of full members :

 Australian Computer Society Inc. (ACS), Australia
 Austrian Computer Society (OCG), Austria
 FBVI-FAIB, Belgium
 Sociedade Brasileira de Computação - SBC, Brazil
 Bulgarian Academy of Sciences, Bulgaria
 Canadian Information Processing Society (CIPS), Canada
 Chinese Institute of Electronics - CIE, China
 Centro Latinoamericano de Estudios Informatica, Costa Rica
 Croatian Information Technology Association (CITA) IIic, Croatia
 Cyprus Computer Society, Cyprus
 Czech Society for Cybernetics and Informatics, Czech Republic
 Danish IT Society, Denmark
 Finnish Information Processing Association, Finland
 Société informatique de France (SIF), France
 Gesellschaft für Informatik e.V. (GI), Germany
 John von Neumann Computer Society (NJSZT), Hungary
 Computer Society of India (CSI), India
 Computer Society of Iran, (CSI), Iran
 Irish Computer Society, Ireland
 Associazione Italiana per l` Informatica ed il Calcolo Automatico (A.I.C.A.), Italia
 Information Processing Society of Japan (IPSJ), Japan
 Lithuanian Computer Society - LIKS, Lithuania
 Koninklijke Nederlandse Vereniging van Informatieprofessionals (KNVI), Netherlands
 Institute of IT Professionals, New Zealand
 Norwegian Computer Society (NCS), Norway
 Polish Academy of Sciences, Poland
 Ordem dos Engenheiros, Portugal
 The Korean Institute of Information Scientists and Engineers (KIISE), Korea
 Informatics Association of Serbia (IAS), Serbia
 Slovak Society for Computer Science, Slovakia
 Slovenian Society INFORMATIKA, Slovenia
 Institute of Information Technology Professionals South Africa IITPSA NPC, South Africa
 Asociación de Técnicos de Informática (ATI), Spain
 The Computer Society of Sri Lanka CSSL, Sri Lanka
 Dataföreningen i Sverige, Sweden
 SI Schweizer Informatik Gesellschaft, Switzerland
 Syrian Computer Society (SCS), Syria
 Ecole Supérieure des Communications De Tunis (SUP`COM), Tunisia
 Ukrainian Federation of Informatics (UFI), Ukraine
 Hamdan Bin Mohammed Smart University, United Arab Emirates
 BCS The Chartered Institute for IT, United Kingdom
 Association for Computing Machinery, ACM 
 Computer Society of Zimbabwe, Zimbabwe

List of associate members as of 2015, June 22:
 Council of European Professional Informatics Societies, Ireland
 International Medical Informatics Association, Japan 
 South East Asia Regional Computer Confederation (SEARCC)
 The Very Large Data Bases Endowment (VLDB), Conferences

References

External links 
 International Federation for Information Processing
 Overview on IFIP publications incl. Open Access

 
Lower Austria
Members of the International Council for Science
Organizations established in 1960
Scientific organisations based in Austria
UNESCO
Members of the International Science Council